Guy Bade Tapé (born 13 May 1992) is an Ivorian professional footballer who plays as a defensive midfielder for Championnat National 2 club Haguenau.

Career 
In January 2022, Tapé signed for Championnat National 2 side Haguenau.

References 

1992 births
Living people
Footballers from Abidjan
Ivorian footballers
French footballers
Naturalized citizens of France
Ivorian emigrants to France
French sportspeople of Ivorian descent
Association football midfielders
Clermont Foot players
Paris FC players
FC Rouen players
FC Martigues players
A.E. Ermionida F.C. players
Al-Shabab Club (Manama) players
FC Rodange 91 players
Voltigeurs de Châteaubriant players
SAS Épinal players
Football Club 93 Bobigny-Bagnolet-Gagny players
AS Beauvais Oise players
FCSR Haguenau players
Championnat National players
Championnat National 3 players
Championnat National 2 players
Football League (Greece) players
Luxembourg National Division players
Ivorian expatriate footballers
Expatriate footballers in Bahrain
Expatriate footballers in Luxembourg
Ivorian expatriate sportspeople in Bahrain
Ivorian expatriate sportspeople in Luxembourg